The men's 10,000 metres in speed skating at the 1984 Winter Olympics took place on 18 February, at the Zetra Ice Rink.

Records
Prior to this competition, the existing world and Olympic records were as follows:

Results

References

Men's speed skating at the 1984 Winter Olympics